Rodolfo Castellanos (born 1980) is a Mexican chef. He is recognized as the first winner of Top Chef Mexico.

Career 
In 2011, he created Origen, a contemporary restaurant in the city of Oaxaca where he reinterprets Oaxacan cuisine.

In 2016, he is awarded as the winner of the first season of Top Chef Mexico, a reality television series that Sony Channel produces for Latin America.

References 

1980 births
Living people
Mexican chefs